Rochester Ukrainians (Ukrainian American Sports Association Rochester) is an American soccer club based in Rochester, New York. The club was founded by Ukrainians that had been settled in the Rochester after World War II.

Honours 
National Amateur Cup Runner-Up: 1
1957

References 
Notes

External links
 Футбол - Українська футбольна діаспора

Men's soccer clubs in New York (state)
Defunct soccer clubs in New York (state)
Ukrainian association football clubs outside Ukraine
Ukrainian-American culture in New York (state)
Ukrainians